Need to know is a category of classified information. 

Need to know or Need to Know may also refer to:

Television
"Need to Know" (House), 2006 episode
"Need to Know" (NCIS), 2012 episode of the American police procedural drama
"Need to Know" (The Professionals), 1980 episode
"Need to Know" (The Twilight Zone), episode of the 1985 series revival
Need to Know (TV program), PBS TV and web newsmagazine

Songs
"Need to Know" (Doja Cat song), 2021  single by Doja Cat from Planet Her
"Need to Know" (Wilkinson song), 2012 single by Wilkinson from Lazers Not Included
"Need to Know", 2018 song by The Story So Far from Proper Dose

Other uses
Need To Know (newsletter), also known as NTK, technology newsletter published from 1997 to 2007

See also
I Need to Know (disambiguation)